Igreja de Santa Maria do Castelo may refer to:

 Igreja de Santa Maria do Castelo (Lourinhã), a church in Portugal
 Igreja de Santa Maria do Castelo (Tavira), a church in Portugal